And in the Morning They Woke Up is a 2003 Russian comedy-drama film directed by Sergey Nikonenko.

Plot 
In the center of the plot are eight completely different people, each of whom wakes up in a sobering room and tries to remember how he ended up there.

Cast 
 Aleksandr Abdulov
 Sergey Garmash
 Igor Bochkin
 Sergey Nikonenko
 Vasiliy Mishchenko
 Evgeniy Stychkin
 Vladimir Bolshov
 Igor Khristenko
 Boris Shcherbakov
 Eduard Martsevich

References

External links 
 

2003 films
2000s Russian-language films
Russian comedy-drama films
2003 comedy-drama films